Ola Uduku is a British African architect who is Head of School at the Manchester School of Architecture. Uduku is a member of the Nigerian Institute of Architects and the Royal Institute of British Architects. She specialises in African educational architecture.

Early life and education 
Uduku is from Nigeria. She attended Federal Government Girls' College, Owerri. She studied architecture at the University of Nigeria, where she worked toward a master's degree in the design of solar housing in the Tropics. She moved to the United Kingdom for her graduate studies. Uduku earned her doctoral degree at the University of Cambridge, where she researched factors that impacted the design of schools in Nigeria. After earning her doctorate, Uduku completed her qualifying examinations at the Royal Institute of British Architects. She was appointed to the faculty at the Edinburgh College of Art.

Research and career 
A few years later Uduku joined the University of Strathclyde, where she earned an Master of Business Administration. Uduku served as Associate Professor in Architecture and Dean for Africa at the University of Edinburgh. Her research considers educational architecture in Africa.

In 2001 Uduku became a founding member of ArchiAfrika, a nonprofit which looks to improve contemporary architectural history in Africa. She created an exhibition at the Manchester School of Art which explored the Alan Vaughan-Richards archive.

In 2017 Uduku was appointed Professor of Architecture in the Manchester School of Architecture. Here she leads graduate research programmes in urbanism, heritage and conservation. She founded EdenAppLabs, a team of researchers who are looking at the use of mobile apps for environmental design.

Select publications

Journal articles

Books

References 

Living people
Year of birth missing (living people)
British Nigerian
Nigerian women academics
Nigerian women architects
British architectural historians
Academics of the University of Manchester
Presidents of the African Studies Association of the United Kingdom